The 1996 Eastern Michigan Eagles football team represented Eastern Michigan University in the 1996 NCAA Division I-A football season. In their second season under head coach Rick Rasnick, the Eagles compiled a 3–8 record (3–5 against conference opponents), finished in eighth place in the Mid-American Conference, and were outscored by their opponents, 284 to 210. The team's statistical leaders included Walter Church with 2,151 passing yards, Mike Scott with 792 rushing yards, and Ontario Pryor with 1,031 receiving yards.

Schedule

References

Eastern Michigan
Eastern Michigan Eagles football seasons
Eastern Michigan Eagles football